Saint Soteris was a Roman virgin and martyr-saint, who was put to death for her faith in the early 4th century. Her feast day is on February 11.

Life 
She was supposedly a woman of very great beauty, who dressed modestly and gave her virginity to Christ. She was arrested on account of her faith, and underwent torture, before being finally beheaded, perhaps around 304 AD.

Her remains were buried in a cemetery created by Pope Callixtus I in the 3rd century along the Appian Way as it approached Rome, which also contained the remains of Saint Cecilia and many other martyrs. In the same region was dedicated a basilica to Saint Soteris.

Saint Ambrose of Milan claimed that he, his older sister Saint Marcellina, and their brother Saint Satyrus, descended from her family, and he wrote about her.

References

304 deaths
Deaths by decapitation
Ante-Nicene Christian martyrs